Ribonuclease (poly-(U)-specific) (ribonuclease (uracil-specific), uracil-specific endoribonuclease, uracil-specific RNase) is an enzyme. This enzyme catalyses the following chemical reaction

 Endonucleolytic cleavage of poly(U) to fragments terminated by 3'-hydroxy and 5'-phosphate groups

This enzyme forms oligonucleotides with chain lengths of 6 to 12.

References

External links 

EC 3.1.26